Bösdorf may refer to places in Germany:
 Bösdorf, Schleswig-Holstein, in the Plön district of Schleswig-Holstein
 Bösdorf, Saxony-Anhalt, in the Börde district of Saxony-Anhalt